Lee Perry may refer to:
 Lee Perry (politician) (born 1966), American politician in Utah
 Lee Perry (voice actor) (born 1959), Australian voice actor
 Lee "Scratch" Perry (1936–2021), Jamaican musician
 Lee Tom Perry (born 1951), American businessman and educator